Halospina is an extremely halophilic genus of bacteria from the family of Hahellaceae with one known species (Halospina denitrificans). Halospina denitrificans has been isolated from sediments from a hypersaline lake.

References

Oceanospirillales
Bacteria genera
Monotypic bacteria genera